Apophatic may refer to:

 Apophasis, a rhetoric device whereby the speaker raises something by denying it
 Apophatic theology, a way of describing the divine by explaining what God is not